Robert Aleksandrovich Schlegel (born December 17, 1984 in Ashkhabad, Turkmen SSR) is a Russian political figure, a former member of the Russian State Duma (2007-2016), and a former member of United Russia. Schlegel currently resides in Germany.

References

1984 births
Living people
Russian nationalists
Critics of Islam
Far-right politics in Russia
United Russia politicians
21st-century Russian politicians
Fifth convocation members of the State Duma (Russian Federation)
Sixth convocation members of the State Duma (Russian Federation)